Neasura apicalis is a moth of the subfamily Arctiinae. It was described by Francis Walker in 1854. It is found in Singapore.

References

 

Lithosiini
Moths described in 1854